Cliff Bennett may refer to:
 Cliff Bennett and the Rebel Rousers, 1960s British rhythm and blues, soul and beat group
 Cliff Bennett (footballer) (1884–1957), Australian rules footballer